Sunil Benimadhu is the Chief Executive of the Stock Exchange of Mauritius (SEM).  He has spearheaded the project to enable the SEM join the World Federation of Exchanges, a key standard-setter in the stock exchange industry.  Benimadhu was elected President of the African Securities Exchanges Association (ASEA) on the August 30, 2010.  He was a member of the Executive Committee of the South Asian Federation of Exchanges (SAFE), and the Chairman of the Committee of SADC Stock Exchanges (CoSSE).  Benimadhu is also a regular speaker on emerging markets and on African markets in international stock exchange conferences.

Before joining the SEM, Benimadhu worked in the Treasury Department of the African Development Bank (ADB). He was the General Manager of the National Mutual Fund Limited in Mauritius and played an instrumental role in the structuring, marketing and setting up of the National Investment Trust Limited, one of the largest investment trusts listed on the SEM.

Education
Benimadhu holds an MBA in Finance and Investment from the University of Illinois Urbana-Champaign, United States. He also holds a DEA in Development Economics and a Maîtrise in Macro-Economics from the University of Aix-Marseille, France.

Professional career

Current positions
 Chief executive - Stock Exchange of Mauritius Port Louis, Mauritius (1998–present)
 Senior Lecturer - University of Mauritius, Reduit, Mauritius (1992–present)
 Board Member - Treasury and Foreign Currency Management Fund

Previous position(s)
 Portfolio Manager- African Development Bank Abidjan (1997–1998)
 Lecturer - Mauritius Institute of Management, University of Surrey Port Louis (1995–1997)
 General manager - National Mutual Fund Port Louis (1992–1997)

References
 Who's Who in Southern Africa
 ASEA President

External links
 Stock Exchange of Mauritius
 African Securities Exchanges Association
 South Asian Federation of Exchanges
 Committee of SADC Stock Exchanges

Year of birth missing (living people)
Living people
Mauritian people of Indian descent
Mauritian businesspeople
Gies College of Business alumni
Chief executive officers
University of Illinois Urbana-Champaign alumni